Americo J. "Mertz" Mortorelli (March 3, 1921 – July 1, 1985) was an American football coach. He served as the head football coach at the University of Wisconsin–Superior from 1954 to 1969 and from 1975 to 1983, compiling a record of 52–176–13.   Mortorelli attended Wisconsin–Superior when it was known as Superior State Teachers College, lettering in football, basketball, and boxing.  In 1949 he received master's degrees in education and physical education from the University of Wisconsin–Madison.  At Wisconsin–Superior, Mortorelli also coached wrestling, basketball, tennis, golf, and track.  He died on July 1, 1985, in Superior, Wisconsin, after suffering a heart attack.

Head coaching record

College

References

External links
 Wisconsin Football Coaches Association profile
 Wisconsin–Superior Hall of Fame profile
 

1921 births
1985 deaths
American men's basketball players
Wisconsin–Superior Yellowjackets athletic directors
Wisconsin–Superior Yellowjackets football coaches
Wisconsin–Superior Yellowjackets football players
Wisconsin–Superior Yellowjackets men's basketball coaches
Wisconsin–Superior Yellowjackets men's basketball players
Wisconsin–Superior Yellowjackets boxers
College golf coaches in the United States
College tennis coaches in the United States
College track and field coaches in the United States
College wrestling coaches in the United States
High school football coaches in Michigan
University of Wisconsin–Madison School of Education alumni
People from Ironwood, Michigan
Players of American football from Michigan